The 1936 Singapore Open, also known as the 1936 Singapore Badminton Championships, took place from 5 September 1936 – 7 February 1937 at the Clerical Union Hall in Balestier, Singapore. The ties were played over a few months with the first round ties being played on the 5th of September and the last (women's singles final) was played on the 7th of February 1937. There was no women's doubles competition due to the lack of entries.

Venue
Clerical Union Hall

Final results

References 

Singapore Open (badminton)
1936 in badminton